Scott B. Court is an American politician and historian who served in the Wyoming House of Representatives from 2017 to 2019, representing the 24th legislative district of Wyoming as a Republican in the 64th Wyoming Legislature.

Education
Court attended Cody High School, Northwest College, the University of Wyoming, and Laramie County Community College. He received a Bachelor of Arts degree and a Master of Public Administration degree from the University of Wyoming.

Career
Prior to serving in the state legislature, Court worked for the Buffalo Bill Center of the West, and was a precinct committeeman in Cheyenne.

2016 election
Court ran for election to the Wyoming House of Representatives in 2016. On August 16, he defeated incumbent Sam Krone in the Republican primary with 72% of the vote after Krone had been charged with felony larceny. On November 8, Court defeated Democrat Paul Fees and independent candidate Sandy Newsome in the general election with 46% of the vote.

Court served in the Wyoming House of Representatives from January 10, 2017 to January 8, 2019. In 2017, he served on the following committees.
Transportation, Highways and Military Affairs
Joint Transportation, Highways and Military Affairs
Court did not seek re-election in 2018.

2020 election
In 2020, Court ran for re-election, though was defeated in the August 18 primary by incumbent Sandy Newsome, who had run for the seat as a Republican in 2018 and won. Court received only 16% of the vote to Newsome's 49%.

Personal life
Court resides in Cody, Wyoming.

Electoral history

2016

2020

Notes

References

External links
Official page at the Wyoming Legislature
Profile from Ballotpedia

Living people
21st-century American politicians
21st-century American historians
Republican Party members of the Wyoming House of Representatives
University of Wyoming alumni
People from Cody, Wyoming
Year of birth missing (living people)